Metal Fighter is a side-scrolling shooter game developed in Asia by Joy Van and published by Color Dreams and Sachen. It was later published as Metal Fighter μ (メタルファイター ミュー) in Japan by Kinema Music in 1991.

Gameplay
The player controls a robot, MCS-920, in an attempt to free planet H17 from alien invaders. MCS-920's weapons and speed can be improved by shooting certain enemies and collecting the power-ups they left behind. There is a special power-up that enables flight.

External links
 Metal Fighter at GameFAQs
 

1989 video games
Color Dreams games
Nintendo Entertainment System games
Nintendo Entertainment System-only games
Science fiction video games
Side-scrolling video games
Single-player video games
Unauthorized video games
Video games about robots
Video games developed in Taiwan